Handyside v United Kingdom (5493/72) was a case decided by the European Court of Human Rights in 1976. Its conclusion contains the famous phrase that:

Nevertheless, the court did not find for the applicant, who had been fined for publishing a book deemed to be obscene.

Facts
Richard Handyside, proprietor of "Stage 1" publishers, purchased British rights of The Little Red Schoolbook, written by Søren Hansen and Jesper Jensen and published, as of 1976, in Denmark, Belgium, Finland, France, West Germany, Greece, Iceland, Italy, the Netherlands, Norway, Sweden, and Switzerland, as well as several non-European countries.

Its chapter on pupils contained a 26-page section concerning "Sex". Handyside sent out several hundred review copies of the book, together with a press release, to a selection of publications from national and local newspapers to educational and medical journals. He also placed advertisements for the book. The book became subject of extensive press comment, both favourable and not.

On 31 March 1971, 1,069 copies of the book were provisionally seized together with leaflets, posters, showcards, and correspondence relating to its publication and sale. On 1 April 1971, 139 more copies were seized. About 18,800 copies of a total print of 20,000 copies were missed and subsequently sold.

On 8 April, a magistrates' court issued two summonses against Handyside for having in his possession obscene books for publication for gain. Handyside ceased distribution of the book and advised bookshops accordingly but, by that time, some 17,000 copies were already in circulation.

On 1 July 1971, Handyside was found guilty of both offences and fined £25 on each summons and ordered to pay £110 costs. His appeal was rejected.

Proceedings before the European Court of Human Rights
The application was lodged by Handyside in 1972.

In 1975, the European Commission of Human Rights had adopted its report on the case, finding no violations of Convention rights, and specifically articles 10, 17, and P1-1 by a majority (no violation of article 18 was found unanimously).

In 1976, court's chamber relinquished jurisdiction in favour of the plenary court.

Judgment
Using the margin of appreciation doctrine, the court held by thirteen votes to one that the interference in Handyside's freedom of expression was both prescribed by law, having a legitimate aim and necessary in a democratic society, thus there was no violation of article 10 ECHR. Importantly, the case bore considerable development for the doctrine of the margin of appreciation. The Court reasoned:

Judge H. Mosler disagreed and filed a dissenting opinion, considering that violation did take place due to interference not being necessary.

The court had also held unanimously that Handyside's property rights (article 1 of protocol 1) were not violated. Judge M. Zekia filed a concurring opinion in this question.

References

External links
ECtHR judgment
Report of the European Commission of Human Rights

Article 1 of Protocol No. 1 of the European Convention on Human Rights
Article 10 of the European Convention on Human Rights
European Court of Human Rights cases decided by the Grand Chamber
European Court of Human Rights cases involving the United Kingdom
Obscenity law
Freedom of expression in the United Kingdom
1976 in case law
1976 in British law